Ali Hilal Saud Al-Jabri (born 29 January 1990), commonly known as Ali Al-Jabri, is an Omani footballer who plays for Fanja SC in Oman Professional League.

Club career
On 6 July 2014, he signed a one-season contract with Fanja SC.

Club career statistics

International career
Ali is part of the first team squad of the Oman national football team. He was selected for the national team for the first time in 2011. He made his first appearance for Oman on 8 December 2012 against Lebanon in the 2012 WAFF Championship. He has made appearances in the 2012 WAFF Championship, the 2014 FIFA World Cup qualification, the 2015 AFC Asian Cup qualification and has represented the national team in the 2010 Gulf Cup of Nations and the 2013 Gulf Cup of Nations.

Honours

Club
With Al-Nahda
Oman Professional League (2): 2008–09, 2013–14
Sultan Qaboos Cup  Runners-up: 2008, 2012, 2013
Oman Super Cup (1): 2009
With Fanja
Oman Professional League Cup (1): 2014-15
Oman Super Cup Runner-up: 2014

References

External links
 
 
 Ali Al-Jabri at Goal.com
 
 
 Ali Al-Jabri - ASIAN CUP Australia 2015

1990 births
Living people
People from Al Buraimi Governorate
Omani footballers
Oman international footballers
Association football midfielders
2015 AFC Asian Cup players
Al-Nahda Club (Oman) players
Fanja SC players
Oman Professional League players
2019 AFC Asian Cup players